Jack Woodrum (born August 15, 1963) is an American politician who has served as the junior West Virginia State Senator from the 10th district since 2020. Woodrum is a Republican.

Early life, education, and career
Woodrum is the son of Joan Woodrum and Jack Woodrum. He received his degree in mortuary science from the Cincinnati College of Mortuary Science and also attended West Virginia University. Before seeking office, Woodrum was employed as a funeral director and mortician. He also served as the president of the Summers County commission.

Elections

2020
In his primary election, Woodrum defeated fellow Republican Dan Hill with 62.34% of the vote. There was no incumbent in the race as Woodrum was running to fill the seat of retiring State Senator Kenny Mann.

In the general election, Woodrum defeated Democrat William Laird IV (who had previously served the 10th district) with 58.59% of the vote.

Tenure

Committee assignments
Interstate Cooperation (Chair) 
Agriculture and Rural Development (Vice chair)
Economic Development
Government Organization
Health and Human Resources
Judiciary
Natural Resources
Transportation and Infrastructure

As of 2020, Woodrum has a C rating from the West Virginia Citizens Defense League, a gun rights organization, and is a member of the NRA.

Worker's rights
Woodrum voted for SB 11, a bill that would make it more difficult for employees to strike.

Confederate monuments
In the State Senate, Woodrum was the lead sponsor of SB 685, the West Virginia Monument and Memorial Protection Act, which would prohibit the removal of Confederate monuments and memorials in West Virginia.

Personal life
Woodrum is married to Debra Woodrum and has three children and one grandchild. He is a Baptist.

References

1963 births
Living people
Republican Party West Virginia state senators
21st-century American politicians
Cincinnati College of Mortuary Science alumni